Henry Ayres (dates of birth and death unknown) was an English cricketer.  Ayres's batting style is also unknown.  Although his date of birth is not recorded, it is known he was christened on 16 October 1791 at Hangleton, Sussex.

Ayres made a single first-class cricket appearance for Sussex against a Kent side at the Royal New Ground, Brighton in 1829.  Kent were dismissed for 96 in their first-innings, in response Sussex were dismissed for 77 in their first-innings, with Ayres being dismissed for a duck, though the Kent bowler who took is wicket isn't recorded.  Kent were dismissed for just 44 in their second-innings, in response Sussex made 66/8 to win the match by 2 wickets, with Ayres ending the innings not out on 0.

References

External links

1791 births
People from Hove
English cricketers
Sussex cricketers
Date of death unknown